Tiffeny Carleen Milbrett (born October 23, 1972) is an American former professional soccer forward who was a longtime member of the United States women's national team. In May 2018 the National Soccer Hall of Fame announced Milbrett will be enshrined in the Hall.  A native of Oregon, she starred at the University of Portland where she scored a then school record 103 goals during her career. She won an Olympic gold medal in 1996 in Atlanta and a silver medal at the 2000 Olympics in Sydney. She also played in three World Cups, winning in 1999. She is in the top five all-time in the United States national soccer team in three offensive categories.

Early life
Milbrett was born in Portland, Oregon, on October 23, 1972. She started her soccer career playing for the Hillsboro Soccer Club in Hillsboro, Oregon, in the Portland metropolitan area. Milbrett grew up in Hillsboro, attending W. Verne McKinney Elementary School in the northwest part of the city. She attended Hillsboro High School (Hilhi) in Hillsboro from 1987 to 1990, where she graduated holding Oregon's state record for goals in a season with 54; and in a career with 131. One of the fields at Hilhi is named after her. She was a three-time Oregonian 3A Player of the Year and a two-time Parade All-American. She also was a talented basketball player and Track and Field participant, and she was offered college scholarships at those two sports.

University of Portland
She attended the University of Portland from 1990 to 1995 and left the school with various awards and National Collegiate Athletic Association (NCAA) records. In 1990, she was named Soccer America's Freshman Soccer Player of The Year, and in 1991, she led her team with 21 goals and six assists. In 1992, her 30 goals and 12 assists placed her second among the nation's scorers, and in 1994, she helped her team reach the soccer Final Four, making the All-Tournament Team.

Milbrett also garnered West Coast Offensive Player of The Year awards in 1992 and 1994, and was a three-time NSCAA All-American as well as a three time finalist for the Hermann Trophy and Missouri Athletic Club Award. Milbrett was her university's all-time leader in goals with 103, and assists with 40. She placed second in NCAA career goals with 103, and tied for fourth in career points with 246. She was also named to Soccer America's College Team of The Decade for the 1990s.

Playing career

Club

Shiroki Serena
Professionally, Milbrett began her career in Japan, when she traveled to after graduating in 1995 and joined the Shiroki Serena of the L. League. She played on that team until 1997.

WUSA 
In 2001, she became a founding member of the New York Power in the Women's United Soccer Association (WUSA). She was the league's MVP as well as Offensive Player of The Year. She scored the league's first hat trick ever, when the Power beat the Boston Breakers 3–1. She was named to the WUSA's second team in 2002, when she finished eighth in the league in points.

Sunnanå SK, Linköpings FC, Vancouver Whitecaps
In March 2005, Milbrett went to Sweden for two months to fine-tune her game, scoring five goals for Sunnanå SK during her brief stint. She also played for Linköpings FC in the Swedish Damallsvenskan, having transferred there from the Vancouver Whitecaps Women of the United Soccer Leagues W-League.

FC Gold Pride
In March 2009, Milbrett was selected to play with FC Gold Pride of the new Women's Professional Soccer and began play in April 2009.  In her first appearance with FC Gold Pride, she scored the game-winning goal. For the 2009 season she scored 4 goals in 19 games.

International

Milbrett was a member of the US-under 20 team from 1990 to 1993, and saw her first action with the United States women's national soccer team in 1991, against China. She scored her first goal with that selection in 1992, against Norway, and helped the team win the International Women's Tournament in France in 1993. She played a total of 21 games with the senior team during that period, and in 1995, she finally joined the senior team full-time. She was a member of the team that finished third at the World Cup that year in Sweden, and in 1996, she became a starter for the team that won the 1996 Olympic gold medal in Atlanta, scoring the game-winning goal in the gold medal game against China. In 1997, she set a women's national team record with five assists in a game against Australia, and in 1998, she was a member of the team that won the gold medal at the Goodwill Games.

In 1999, she was the goal leader on the US team that won the World Cup, and in 2000 she helped the team obtain Olympic Games silver in Sydney. She was named the CONCACAF Offensive Player of The Year that same year, as well as Chevrolet's female athlete of the year. She was also nominated along with Hamm and Sun Wen for the first ever FIFA World Player of the Year award, and participated in the 2001 Nike Women's Cup. She also won the Chevrolet Female Athlete of the Year Award for the second time in a row in 2001.

After women's national team coach, April Heinrichs resigned in February 2005 and was replaced by Greg Ryan, Milbrett returned to the national team, and finally earned her elusive 200th cap on June 30 in a friendly against rivals Canada in Virginia Beach, Virginia. Her 100th goal came in Team USA's next match, a friendly against Ukraine in her hometown of Portland at Merlo Field.

Matches and goals scored at World Cup and Olympic tournaments
Tiffeny Milbrett competed as a member of US teams in three FIFA Women's World Cup: Sweden 1995, US 1999 and US 2003;
and two Olympics: Atlanta 1996 and Sydney 2000; played in 28 matches and scored 12 goals at those five global tournaments. Milbrett with her US teams, are gold medalists from Atlanta 1996 Olympics, and world champions from US 1999 world cup, and they finished third place in the other 3 global tournaments she competed in.

International goals

Coaching career
She coached at Northwest Soccer Camp as well as at day camps, personal training and Elite Team Training Sessions, and women's clinics. Milbrett is a member of the People to People Ambassador Programs. She coached the MVLA Tornado girls' team. She also coaches for the ECNL girls team.

See also

 List of association women football players with 100 or more international goals
 List of footballers with 100 or more caps
 List of Olympic medalists in football
 List of 1996 Summer Olympics medal winners
 List of 2000 Summer Olympics medal winners
 List of American and Canadian soccer champions
 All-time FC Gold Pride roster
 List of people from Hillsboro, Oregon
 List of Vancouver Whitecaps Women players

References

Match reports

External links

 
 FC Gold Pride player profile
 

1972 births
Living people
Sportspeople from Hillsboro, Oregon
United States women's international soccer players
Footballers at the 1996 Summer Olympics
Footballers at the 2000 Summer Olympics
Olympic gold medalists for the United States in soccer
Olympic silver medalists for the United States in soccer
Parade High School All-Americans (girls' soccer)
Women's United Soccer Association players
New York Power players
Portland Pilots women's soccer players
Vancouver Whitecaps FC (women) players
FC Gold Pride players
Expatriate women's soccer players in Canada
FIFA Century Club
American women's soccer players
Hillsboro High School (Oregon) alumni
USL W-League (1995–2015) players
Soccer players from Portland, Oregon
Damallsvenskan players
Linköpings FC players
1995 FIFA Women's World Cup players
1999 FIFA Women's World Cup players
2003 FIFA Women's World Cup players
FIFA Women's World Cup-winning players
Sunnanå SK players
Shiroki FC Serena players
Nadeshiko League players
American expatriate women's soccer players
American expatriate sportspeople in Japan
Expatriate women's footballers in Japan
Expatriate women's footballers in Sweden
Women's association football forwards
Medalists at the 2000 Summer Olympics
Medalists at the 1996 Summer Olympics
Competitors at the 1998 Goodwill Games
Women's Professional Soccer players
National Soccer Hall of Fame members